Monsuno, released as  in Japan, is an animated series that premiered in the United States on February 23, 2012 on Nickelodeon's sister channel, Nicktoons and began airing on TV Tokyo in Japan in October 2012, with global launches staggered by country sometime between mid-2012 and early 2013 through Nickelodeon. The series was created by Jeremy Padawer and Jared Wolfson. It is distributed by FremantleMedia and is produced by Dentsu Entertainment USA (part of Dentsu Aegis Network), Jakks Pacific, and The Topps Company. Japanese animation studio Larx Entertainment animated the series.

Synopsis

Season 1: World Master
The show revolves around "re-awakened Monster DNA called Monsuno" that finds its way into the unsuspecting hands of adventure-seeking teenagers Chase, Jinja, and Bren. Accompanied by their Monsuno, Lock, Charger, and Quickforce, they are searching for Chase's father Jeredy Suno, the creator of the Monsuno. They are soon joined by Beyal, a monk from the Himalayas along with his Monsuno Glowblade. Beyal often speaks of five people that with the help of their Monsuno, could change the world. It just so happens that they are that five, along with Dax, a teenager who along with his Monsuno Airswitch, opposes the team and is disliked among most people. The team has yet to befriend him and persuade him to join their cause. They are also on the run from a H.A.M.M.E.R.-type agency called "S.T.O.R.M." (Strategic Tactical Operatives for Recovery of Monsuno) whose plans are still in question and Dr. Emanuel Klipse, a malevolent scientist who has his own nefarious plans.

Season 2: Combat Chaos
The 5 adventure-seeking teenagers are once again in the battle of Monsunos, now, however, with Jeredy Suno officially back from being missing or kidnapped. But along with old foes, come new ones, with The Forge Resistance, a manufacturer bent on destroying the world with Wild Core Bombs, The S.T.O.R.M. Strike Squad, a team which could be considered the anti version of Team Core-Tech handpicked by Charlemagne, the Hand of Destiny, a team of century-old tribes who have hidden themselves from the world underground long ago, and Six, a teenager clone of Dr. Eklipse. Now on Team Core-Tech's tail, Chase and his friends are ready to take the heat. But as the battle becomes tougher, the team must face new problems and must come to connect to their Monsunos than ever before.

Season 3
The series continues after the events of Monsuno: Combat Chaos, with the introduction of Core-Tech and S.T.O.R.M's merging, Eklipse and Forge Resistance with the newly-manufactured Dino Monsuno, and return of Hand of Destiny with their new non-shapeshifting alien Monsunos. The three survived members of the Hand have been reverted to children- Petros, Terz and Dasha now work with Digby Droog. There are also some returning characters from Season 1, like the Bookman and Grandma Future. With the help of their new Hyper Monsuno, Team Core-Tech may stand a chance against their adversaries.

Characters
The characters are accompanied by Monsunos (giant high-tech/mechanical/armored hybrid monsters of one or more animal species), which are contained in cylinder regeneration chamber capsules known as "cores".

  (voiced by Cam Clarke in English and by Kenn in Japanese) - One of the main protagonists. A brave and adventurous 15-years old boy, Chase is the leader of Team Core-Tech. In the first season "World Masters," Chase engages on a journey to find his father Jeredy Suno, a research scientist who disappeared while experimenting with the mysterious power source called Monsuno Essence which brought him into conflict with both the corrupt government agency S.T.O.R.M. and the rogue scientist Dr. Klipse. In the second season "Combat Chaos" Chase is repeatedly having visions of his mother Sophia who was believed to be deceased which leaves him to confront The Hand of Destiny which might have a hand at Sofia's disappearance.
 Jinja (voiced by Karen Strassman in English and by Asami Tano in Japanese) - One of the main protagonists, renamed  in the Japanese version. Jinja is the self-proclaimed "sassy" and genuinely outspoken tomboy member of Team Core-Tech who is often the first one into battle. Jinja is a strong supporter to Chase in his journeys and is known to playfully tease Bren on occasion. Jinja was at first interested in Beyal and had no fear of showing it. In the second and third season she was more comfortable and calm about it.
  (voiced by Christopher Corey Smith in English and by Chihiro Suzuki in Japanese) - One of the main protagonists. A timid but inquisitive boy who's an adept computer programmer and hacker. Bren is one of Chase's closest friends and is usually the one to kaiser or decode any piece of Technology or Monsuno Equipment that Team Core-Tech comes across. Bren has a bit of a playfully antagonistic relationship with Jinja.
 Beyal (voiced by Kirk Thornton in English and by Sachi Kokuryu in Japanese) - A supporting protagonist. He was renamed  in the Japanese version. An introspective and spiritual young man, Beyal was introduced in the episode "Knowledge" as a monk who possesses "The Monsuno Sight"; A special ability that allows one to see into the future. Beyal helped Chase, Bren, and Jinja escape from The Bookman's evil clutches and joined Team Core-Tech afterwards. He was a good friend of Dax, since they were the last members who joined the team. His wide spectrum of knowledge, his alternative methods and his intense emotions have aided in tackling difficult situations and making him the most beloved character of the series. Beyal is attracted to Jinja although he does not admit it aloud.
 Dax (voiced by Keith Silverstein in English by Hiroshi Shimozaki in Japanese) - A cocky young drifter that joined Team Core-Tech in the episode "R.S.P.V.". Dax has a mysterious past that might tie into Dr. Klipse's illegal Monsuno research. In the original English version, he has a bit of an Australian accent. Renamed  in the Japanese version. Dax enjoys making fun of Bren, since they are not fond of each other a lot. On the contrary, he likes gibing Beyal even though he is jealous of his relationship with Jinja. Having experienced the cruelty of street life, Dax has become impulsive and shrewd.

Episodes

The series premiered on February 23, 2012 with the first two episodes "Clash" and "Courage" as a back-to-back one-hour special.

International broadcasts 
The Nordic broadcasts were premiered in Nickelodeon in Denmark, Norway, Sweden (as Monsuno) since 2012, with SDI Media as the Nordic studio, and Nickelodeon in Finland (as Monsuno) since 2012, with SDI Media as the Finnish studio.

The series was also premiered in Nickelodeon in Germany (as Monsuno) since 2012, with SDI Media as the German studio, Nickelodeon in Netherlands (as Monsuno) since 2012, with SDI Media as the Dutch studio, Nickelodeon in Poland (as Monsuno) since 2012, with Master Film as the Polish studio.

China's broadcast was premiered on CCTV-14, starting with the first series on 15 May 2017.

Home media
Shout! Factory began releasing Monsuno episodes on DVD in January 2013. Monsuno: Destiny was released on January 8, 2013, and Monsuno: Power was released on May 21, 2013.

Other media

Toy line
Jakks Pacific owns exclusive worldwide rights to manufacture Monsuno's toy products.

Trading card game
A trading card game (TCG) adaptation based on the series was released on March 5, 2012.

References

External links

 
  Official Japanese Site at Bandai
  TV Tokyo's Monsuno Website
 
 
 

2010s American animated television series
2012 anime television series debuts
2012 American television series debuts
2014 American television series endings
American children's animated action television series
American children's animated adventure television series
American children's animated science fantasy television series
Japanese children's animated action television series
Japanese children's animated adventure television series
Japanese children's animated science fantasy television series
Larx Entertainment
Man of Action Studios
Television series by FremantleMedia Kids & Family
Hulu original programming
Nicktoons (TV network) original programming
Teen animated television series
TV Tokyo original programming